Ibrahim Khamis (born 1960) is an Emirati sprinter. He competed in the men's 4 × 400 metres relay at the 1984 Summer Olympics.

References

External links
 

1960 births
Living people
Athletes (track and field) at the 1984 Summer Olympics
Emirati male sprinters
Emirati male hurdlers
Olympic athletes of the United Arab Emirates
Place of birth missing (living people)